Fluorosulfuric acid (IUPAC name: sulfurofluoridic acid) is the inorganic compound with the chemical formula HSO3F. It is one of the strongest acids commercially available. It is a tetrahedral molecule and is closely related to sulfuric acid, H2SO4, substituting a fluorine atom for one of the hydroxyl groups. It is a colourless liquid, although commercial samples are often yellow.

Chemical properties
Fluorosulfuric acid is a free-flowing colorless liquid. It is soluble in polar organic solvents (e.g. nitrobenzene, acetic acid, and ethyl acetate), but poorly soluble in nonpolar solvents such as alkanes. Reflecting its strong acidity, it dissolves almost all organic compounds that are even weak proton acceptors. HSO3F hydrolyzes slowly to hydrogen fluoride (HF) and sulfuric acid. The related triflic acid retains the high acidity of HSO3F but is more hydrolytically stable. The self-ionization of fluorosulfonic acid also occurs:
  K = 4.0 × 10−8 (at 298 K)

Production
Fluorosulfuric acid is prepared by the reaction of HF and sulfur trioxide:
SO3 + HF → HSO3F
Alternatively, KHF2 or CaF2 can be treated with oleum at 250 °C. Once freed from HF by sweeping with an inert gas, HSO3F can be distilled in a glass apparatus.

Super-acids
HSO3F is one of the strongest known simple Brønsted acids, although carborane-based acids are still stronger. It has an H0 value of −15.1 compared to −12 for sulfuric acid. The combination of HSO3F and the Lewis acid antimony pentafluoride produces "Magic acid", which is a far stronger protonating agent. These acids all fall into the category of "superacids", acids stronger than 100% sulfuric acid.

Applications
HSO3F is useful for regenerating mixtures of HF and H2SO4 for etching lead glass.

HSO3F isomerizes alkanes and the alkylation of hydrocarbons with alkenes, although it is unclear if such applications are of commercial importance. It can also be used as a laboratory fluorinating agent.

Safety
Fluorosulfuric acid is considered to be highly toxic and extremely corrosive. It hydrolyzes to release HF. Addition of water to HSO3F can be violent, similar to the addition of water to sulfuric acid but much more violent.

See also
 Chlorosulfuric acid
 Fluoroboric acid
 Fluoroantimonic acid
 Sulfuryl fluoride 
 Methyl fluorosulfonate, an organic ester of FSO3H
 Trifluorosulfate

References

Sulfuryl compounds
Fluoro complexes
Superacids
Mineral acids
Fluorinating agents
Sulfur oxoacids